Archbishop of London may refer to:

 Archbishop of Southwark, head of the Roman Catholic Archdiocese of Southwark, London
 Archbishop of Westminster, head of the Roman Catholic Diocese of Westminster, London
 Coptic Orthodox Archbishop of London, a leader in the Coptic Orthodox Church in Britain and Ireland
 Bishop of London, Church of England bishop sometimes mistakenly referred to as an archbishop

See also
 Archbishop of Canterbury, principal leader of the Church of England
 The legendary Archbishop of London associated with St Peter upon Cornhill